Prionella is a genus of picture-winged flies in the family Ulidiidae.

Species
 P. beauvoisii
 P. villosa

References

Ulidiidae